is a Japanese fantasy novel series written by Yoshiki Tanaka. It was published from 1986 to 2017, with sixteen novels and one side-story in the official guidebook Arslan Senki Dokuhon. Set in ancient Persia, it is loosely based on the Persian epic of Amir Arsalan.

It was adapted into a film duology and a 4-episode original video animation released from 1991 to 1995. It was also adapted into a manga series by Chisato Nakamura, which ran in Kadokawa Shoten's Monthly Asuka Fantasy DX from November 1991 to September 1996. In 2013, a second manga adaptation illustrated by Hiromu Arakawa began in Kodansha's Bessatsu Shōnen Magazine, which was later adapted into an anime television series.

Synopsis

Setting
The story is set in a legendary vision of an indistinct amalgam of over a thousand years of ancient Persia and nearby other countries. While the world in which it takes place is one where magic obviously exists, said magic is of an extremely limited nature. Until the middle of the anime, the only magical happenings involve a few spells and a giant, humanoid monster. There are many evil monsters such as ghouls and winged monkeys, appear in the second half of the novel series. Especially the first half of the series is, at the core, a war story taking place between human nations. In addition, there are underlying themes exploring the repercussions of slavery on a society, having an absolute monarch who treats the poor as cattle, and religious obsession.

Plot

The story follows the exploits of Arslan, the crown prince of the kingdom of Pars ("پارس" or "فارس" is equivalent word to Persia and what the land of Persians "پارسیان" was called), and it is divided into two parts. In the first part, Pars is taken over by the neighboring nation of Lusitania after Arslan's father, King Andragoras III, falls victim to a treacherous plot led by some of his most trusted retainers. After barely escaping with his life, Arslan rejoins his loyal servant, Daryun. Backed up by only a few more companions, including the philosopher and tactician Narsus and his young servant Elam, also Farangis, an aloof, cold priestess, and Gieve, a travelling musician and con-man, Arslan stands against overwhelming odds to assemble an army strong enough to liberate his nation from the Lusitanian army which is led by the elusive warrior known as "Silvermask", who is later revealed to be another contender to Pars' throne. In the second part, Arslan, now king of Pars, divides himself between defending his country against several external threats, including Silvermask, who is still at large, seeking to claim the throne for himself, and addressing the needs and hopes of his subjects.

Inspirations

The protagonist's name appears to have been taken from the popular Persian epic Amir Arsalan. Arslan and his Parsian enemies and allies primarily share many parallels with Cyrus the Great and other historical figures of 6th century BCE Persia (albeit with several liberties taken), whereas the conflicts with the Lusitanian forces (which bear the Byzantium Orthodox cross, also used by the Varangians of Kievan Rus') – despite mostly French names and a certain religious zealotry implying a connection to the (Catholic) Crusades (again, with liberties taken) – appear to be based on the East Roman–Persian Wars, specifically those of the 6th century CE. Furthermore, several names of prominent Parsian characters appear to be taken from known important figures throughout Persian history as well as the historically unsubstantiated legendary parts of the historiographic Persian epic Shahnameh. Additionally, supernatural elements mostly based on ancient Near East mythology increasingly play a role as the series goes on.

Media

Novels
The original novel, Arslan Senki, was written by Dr. Yoshiki Tanaka. There are sixteen novels in the Arslan Senki storyline. The Kadokawa edition (which includes first ten novels only) is illustrated by manga artist and character-designer Yoshitaka Amano (whose other works include the character design for several Final Fantasy games and for Vampire Hunter D), while the Kobunsha edituion is illustrated by Shinobu Tanno.

Manga

The novels were adapted into a manga illustrated by Chisato Nakamura. The manga was published by Kadokawa Shoten in the Asuka Fantasy DX shōjo magazine from 1991 to 1996 and compiled into thirteen volumes, adapting the first seven novels.

A second manga adaptation of Arslan Senki started serialization in Kodansha's Bessatsu Shōnen Magazine in July 2013, illustrated by Hiromu Arakawa, best known for the manga titles Fullmetal Alchemist and Silver Spoon. This adaptation is simul-published by Crunchyroll, while Kodansha Comics is publishing the manga in North America since 2014.

Films and OVA series
The popularity of the novels led to the creation of two films and subsequently a series of OVAs with character designs adapted by Sachiko Kamimura. The films were released in 1991–1992, which is why each one is hour long, rather than the traditional half-hour, and were produced by Kadokawa Shoten and Sony Music Entertainment Japan. An OVA series of four episodes that followed up the films was released in 1993–1995.

Both the films and OVA series were licensed by Central Park Media and were released on DVD and VHS. The English dub for Part 1 was produced by Manga UK (who had also licensed the anime in the same region), while Part 2 was dubbed by Central Park Media themselves. This caused a lot of inconsistencies in both dubs. Because of the aforementioned issues regarding translations and names, as well as possible issues with funding the project, it took an extremely long time for the final 2 episodes of the Arslan anime to make its way to the United States.

Anime 

Due to the continued popularity of the novels, an anime was created by Liden Films and Sanzigen, based on the manga adaptation by Hiromu Arakawa. The anime consists of 2 season, released between 2015 and 2016. The first season consists of 26 episodes and started airing on the 5th of April 2015, running until the end of September of the same year. The second season consists of 8 episodes and aired between the 3rd of July 2016 and the 21st of August of the same year. 

The first season covers volume 1-4 of the novels, while the second season covers volumes 5 and 6 of the novels.

Video games

The first video game based on The Heroic Legend of Arslan was released in 1993 for Sega Mega-CD. A strategy RPG in the vein of similar titles of the era such as the Fire Emblem series, it serves as a companion to the OVA series.

Arslan: The Warriors of Legend, a hack and slash video game developed by Omega Force and published by Koei Tecmo in 2015, serves as a companion to the anime TV series.

The Heroic Legend of Arslan: Warrior's Qualification, a game for smartphones distributed by Sakura Soft. The game was launched on April 27, 2017 and terminated on August 16, 2018. It was based on the manga adaptation by Hiromu Arakawa.

See also
Aslan (disambiguation)
Shamshir-e Zomorrodnegar
Fulad-zereh
Cup of Jamshid
Persian literature

References

Further reading

{{cite web|last=Sevakis|first=Justin|title=Heroic Legend of Arslan (Part 1) - Buried Treasure|url=https://www.animenewsnetwork.com/buried-treasure/2007-12-13|website=Anime News Network|date=ARSLAN

External links

1986 Japanese novels
1991 anime films
1992 anime films
1993 anime OVAs
Book series introduced in 1986
Central Park Media
High fantasy anime and manga
Historical fantasy anime and manga
Japanese fantasy novels
J.C.Staff
Kadokawa Shoten manga
Novels by Yoshiki Tanaka
Novels about religion
Persian mythology in popular culture
Shōjo manga
Sword and sorcery anime and manga
War in anime and manga